Kevin Mitchell (born June 21, 1981) is a male water polo player from Canada. He was a member of the Canada men's national water polo team for 8 years, 

Kevin grew up in Maple Ridge BC where he attended Laity View Elementary and Thomas Haney Secondary. He started swimming with the Haney Neptunes Aquatic club. 

International Events
2001 Fina Jr. World Championships
2002 Commonwealth Gold Medal
2003 Pan American Games Bronze Medal
2003 Fina World Championships
2004 French Open 2nd
2005 Polwelz Cup 1st
2005 FINA World Championships 13th
2006 Commonwealth Championships 2nd
2007 FINA World Championships 12th
2007 Australian National League Silver Medal
2007 French Open 1st
2008 Olympic Qualification 4th
2008 Olympic Games 11th

Kevin Mitchell's most influential coaches in his career were Stevan Buovac, John Csikos, and Dragan Jovanovic.

References
 Canadian Olympic Committee

1981 births
Living people
Canadian male water polo players
Water polo players at the 2008 Summer Olympics
Olympic water polo players of Canada
Sportspeople from Vancouver
Pan American Games bronze medalists for Canada
Pan American Games medalists in water polo
Water polo players at the 2003 Pan American Games
Water polo players at the 2007 Pan American Games
Medalists at the 2003 Pan American Games
Medalists at the 2007 Pan American Games

Ethnikos Piraeus Water Polo Club players